Sascha Amhof (born 4 March 1980) is a Swiss professional football referee. He has been a full international for FIFA since 2013.

References

External links
 Profile on Swiss Football Association homepage

1980 births
Living people
Swiss football referees